Ceryx cybelistes is a moth of the subfamily Arctiinae. It was described by William Jacob Holland in 1893. It is found in Gabon, Ghana and Uganda.

References

Ceryx (moth)
Moths described in 1893